Below are the squads for the women's football tournament at the 1990 Asian Games, played in Beijing, China.

China
Coach: Shang Ruihua

Chinese Taipei
Coach: Chen Ting-hsiung

Hong Kong
Coach: Li Moon Wah

Japan
Coach: Tamotsu Suzuki

North Korea
Coach: Cha Jong-sok

South Korea
Coach: Park Kyung-hwa

References

 Korea Results 1990
 Japan Results 1990
 China Results 1990

External links

1990
Squads